Sipunculus robustus is a species of unsegmented benthic marine worm in the phylum Sipuncula, the peanut worms.

Distribution
This peanut worm is found in the northwestern Indian Ocean and the Red Sea, but not the Mediterranean Sea, and also it is found on the Atlantic side of Central America, but not on the Pacific side.

References

Sipunculans
Animals described in 1865